Basie (reissued as The Band of Distinction) is an album by pianist/bandleader Count Basie recorded in 1954 and originally released on the Clef label. the album should not be confused with Basie's 1958 album which became known as The Atomic Mr. Basie.

Reception

AllMusic awarded the album 3 stars.

Track listing
 "Blues Backstage" (Frank Foster) - 4:36	
 "Down for the Count" (Foster) - 6:02	
 "Eventide" (Bill Doggett) - 4:40	
 "Ain't Misbehavin'" (Fats Waller, Andy Razaf, Harry Brooks) - 3:43	
 "Perdido" (Juan Tizol) - 4:55	
 "Ska-Di-Dle-Dee-Bee-Doo" (Neal Hefti) - 3:37	
 "Two Franks" (Hefti) - 3:16	
 "Rails" (Dizzy Gillespie, Buster Harding) - 5:57

Personnel 
Count Basie - piano, organ
Wendell Culley, Reunald Jones, Thad Jones, Joe Newman - trumpet
Henry Coker, Benny Powell - trombone 
Bill Hughes - trombone, piano
Marshall Royal - alto saxophone, clarinet 
Ernie Wilkins -  alto saxophone, tenor saxophone, arranger 
Frank Wess - tenor saxophone 
Frank Foster - tenor saxophone, arranger
Charlie Fowlkes - baritone saxophone 
Freddie Green - guitar 
Eddie Jones - bass
Gus Johnson - drums
Manny Albam, Buster Harding, Neal Hefti - arranger

References 

1955 albums
Count Basie Orchestra albums
Clef Records albums
Verve Records albums
Albums arranged by Neal Hefti
Albums arranged by Ernie Wilkins
Albums arranged by Manny Albam
Albums arranged by Frank Foster (musician)
Albums produced by Norman Granz